Americus is an unincorporated community in Montgomery County, in the U.S. state of Missouri.

History
A post office called Americus was established in 1867, and remained in operation until 1959. The community was named after Amerigo Vespucci, an explorer and cartographer.

Notable people
Lester Reiff, a racing jockey, was born at Americus in 1877.

John Reiff, a racing jockey and younger brother of Lester Reiff, was born at Americus in 1885. He was inducted into the US Racing Hall of Fame in 1956.

References

Unincorporated communities in Montgomery County, Missouri
Unincorporated communities in Missouri